Beverly Hanson (December 5, 1924 – April 12, 2014) was an American professional golfer who played on the LPGA Tour.

Hanson was born in Fargo, North Dakota in 1924. She studied at the University of North Dakota, Mills College in Oakland, California and the University of Wisconsin and was a bassoon player, performing with civic orchestras. As an amateur golfer, she won the Texas Open in 1949 and both the California and Southern California ladies' championships. She was a member of the 1950 U.S. Curtis Cup golf team and that year won the U.S. Women's Amateur.

In 1951, Hanson turned professional and won the very first event she competed in. She won the inaugural LPGA Championship in 1955, defeating Louise Suggs. In 1958 she was the leading money winner on the LPGA Tour.

Hanson had 17 career wins on the LPGA Tour of which three were majors. Besides the inaugural LPGA major title, in 1956 she won the Women's Western Open and in 1958 the Titleholders Championship.

Hanson died on April 12, 2014 in Twin Falls, Idaho, from complications from Alzheimer's and COPD.

Hanson was elected to the World Golf Hall of Fame in 2023 and will be inducted in 2024.

Professional wins (18)

LPGA Tour wins (17)
 1950 (1) Women's Texas Open (as an amateur)
 1951 (1) Eastern Open
 1953 (1) Boca Raton Weathervane
 1954 (2) St. Petersburg Open, Wichita Open
 1955 (2) LPGA Championship, Battle Creek Open
 1956 (1) Women's Western Open
 1957 (2) Smokey Open, Land of Sky Open
 1958 (2) Titleholders Championship, Lawton Open
 1959 (4) Golden Triangle Festival, American Women's Open, Spokane Open, Links Invitation Open
 1960 (1) St. Petersburg Open

Other wins (1)
 1949 Women's Texas Open (as an amateur)
 1955 Hot Springs 4-Ball Invitational (with Kathy Cornelius)

Source

Major championships

Wins (3)

Team appearances
Amateur
 Curtis Cup (representing the United States): 1950 (winners)

See also
 List of golfers with most LPGA Tour wins
 List of golfers with most LPGA major championship wins

References

External links
 

American female golfers
LPGA Tour golfers
Winners of ladies' major amateur golf championships
Winners of LPGA major golf championships
Golfers from North Dakota
Golfers from California
Golfers from Idaho
University of North Dakota alumni
Sportspeople from Fargo, North Dakota
Sportspeople from Riverside County, California
People from Sun Valley, Idaho
1924 births
2014 deaths
21st-century American women